Pic d'Ivohibe Reserve is a wildlife reserve of Madagascar. It was created in 1964.

Geography
Ivohibe is in the southern part of the Andringitra Massif, in the region of the Ihorombe.
The reserve covers 3 453 ha.

It is situated near the village of Ivohibe, about 110 km from Ihosy by secondary roads.

The rainy season starts on October and lasts until March.

Species

See also
 Andringitra National Park

References

External links
 Madagascar National Parcs -  Ivohibe Reserve

Special reserves of Madagascar
Protected areas established in 1964
Ihorombe
IUCN Category IV
Madagascar subhumid forests